Frisilia homalistis is a moth in the family Lecithoceridae. It is endemic to Taiwan.

Description
The wingspan is 15–17 mm. The forewings are light yellow with two clearly visible discal dots.

References

Frisilia
Moths of Taiwan
Endemic fauna of Taiwan
Moths described in 1935
Taxa named by Edward Meyrick